Ogletree is a surname.

Notable people with the surname
Alec Ogletree (born 1991), American football player
Al Ogletree (1930–2019), American baseball coach
Andrew Ogletree (born 1998), American football player
Andy Ogletree (born 1998), American golfer
Charles Ogletree (born 1952), American professor
Charlie Ogletree (born 1967), American sailor
Craig Ogletree (1968–2021), American football player
Francis Ogletree (1826–1916), Canadian farmer and politician
Kevin Ogletree (born 1987), American football player
Mike Ogletree (born 1956), Scottish drummer